Peter Jurasik (born April 25, 1950) is an American actor known for his television roles as Londo Mollari in the 1990s science fiction series Babylon 5 and Sid the Snitch on the 1980s series Hill Street Blues and its short-lived spinoff Beverly Hills Buntz. Peter Jurasik also portrayed Oberon Geiger, Diana's boss, in the T.V. series Sliders.

Personal life
Jurasik was born in Queens, New York. He is the third of four children. He attended the University of New Hampshire, where he appeared in several plays. He lives with his wife and son in Wilmington, North Carolina, and teaches acting for the camera in the Theatre Department and the Film Studies Department at the University of North Carolina at Wilmington.

Career

Acting
Jurasik is best known for playing Londo Mollari on Babylon 5. He has guest-starred as an ornithologist in one episode of MacGyver, CID investigator Captain Triplett in two episodes of M*A*S*H, and Dr. Oberon Geiger on three episodes of Sliders.

Jurasik starred as Mitch Kline in the 1983 short-lived CBS series Bay City Blues and as Dr. Simon Ward in an episode of Columbo: "Sex and the Married Detective" in 1989.  He also had a long-running occasional role on Hill Street Blues as "Sid the Snitch" which became semi-regular in the last two seasons.  At the conclusion of that series, his and co-star Dennis Franz's characters were spun off into the short-lived series Beverly Hills Buntz.  In 1985, Jurasik co-starred with Michael Keaton and Clint Howard in the Keaton-produced short film "But I'm Happy" which aired on NBC as part of David Letterman's 'Holiday Film Festival'.

His film roles include Crom in the film Tron (1982), with future Babylon 5 co-star Bruce Boxleitner, and as Roy, the perfect father neighbor, in Problem Child (1990).

In 2000, Jurasik appeared in the Doctor Who audio adventure Winter for the Adept.

Writing
In 1998, he wrote Diplomatic Act with William H. Keith, Jr., a science fiction novel wherein the lead character, an actor in a science fiction show, is kidnapped by aliens who think he is the character from the program. The book is similar in tone and story to Galaxy Quest, which was released one year later.

Filmography

References

External links

 
 

1950 births
American male film actors
American male television actors
Living people
Male actors from New York City
People from Queens, New York
University of North Carolina at Wilmington faculty
University of New Hampshire alumni